Travis Williams may refer to:
Travis Williams (basketball) (born 1969), NBA player for the Charlotte Hornets
Travis Williams (basketball coach) (born 1972), American college basketball coach
Travis Williams (linebacker) (born 1983), National Football League linebacker for the Atlanta Falcons
Travis Williams (running back) (1946–1991), National Football League kick returner for the Green Bay Packers
Travis Williams (sports executive), American baseball and hockey executive
Travis Williams (tailback) (1892–1986), National Football League running back for the Evansville Crimson Giants

See also
Tarvis Williams